Mrs. Fitzherbert, also known as Princess Fitz and A Court Secret, is a 1947 black and white British historical drama film directed by Montgomery Tully and starring Peter Graves, Joyce Howard and Leslie Banks. It depicts the relationship between George IV and Maria Fitzherbert. It is an adaptation of the 1945 novel Princess Fitz by Winifred Carter

Whilst promotional material summarises the plot as the love affair between a prince and a "commoner", Mrs Fitzherbert falls far short of the definition of a "commoner" and would best be described as "lower aristocracy".

Plot
The Duke of Wellington goes to meet an elderly Maria Fitzherbert to inform her of George IV's death and she recalls how she had rebuffed George at their first meeting, in which he saved her from a Protestant rioter on the night on the Gordon Riots. She continues to rebuff him but George pursues marriage with her, even knowing that - as she is a Roman Catholic - this will breach both the Act of Succession and the Royal Marriages Act. She flees to Brighton and George soon follows, where they meet again and agree simply to remain friends. However, scandal soon grows as they attend more and more social occasions together.

Maria initially refuses a renewed offer of marriage from George but soon afterwards relents and agrees to a secret marriage after he makes a suicide attempt. George is summoned from the couple's country retreat by his mother Queen Charlotte to scotch rumours of the marriage - he instead confirms them but fails to win Charlotte round to the marriage. George and Maria move back to Brighton, where he begins work on Brighton Pavilion and moves a House of Commons debate on his finances, though this degenerates into a discussion of the rumoured marriage. Fox quells the debate by presenting a letter from George denying rumours of the marriage, though he omits to add that the letter is not new but was in fact written before the marriage. George goes to meet his father but finds himself forestalled, as the letter has convinced the king that George really has repudiated the marriage. Overjoyed, he arranges to pay off George's debts and George leaves without even mentioning Maria.

George retreats into decadence and depression, acquiescing to a false rumour of an affair between Maria and the Duke of Bedford spread by Lady Jersey, finally repudiating Maria and accepting a political marriage with Caroline of Brunswick, though his first meeting with her goes badly. Maria retires to the country, where George's brother William keeps her informed of developments, whilst George's friends only just manage to stop him running back to Maria even on the morning of his wedding to Caroline. The scene shifts back to the elderly Maria and Wellington discussing George's death, where he informs her that among his last words was "Marguerita", his pet name for her, proving he had not forgotten her.

Cast
 Peter Graves as Prince of Wales
 Joyce Howard as Maria Fitzherbert
 Leslie Banks as Charles James Fox, friend of the Prince
 Margaretta Scott as Lady Jersey, lady-in-waiting and ally to Queen Charlotte
 Wanda Rotha as Princess Caroline of Brunswick
 Mary Clare as the Duchess of Devonshire
 Frederick Valk as George III, the Prince's father
 Ralph Truman as Richard Brinsley Sheridan, friend of the Prince
 John Stuart as Duke of Bedford
 Helen Haye as Lady Sefton, Maria's chaperone
 Chili Bouchier as Norris
 Lily Kann as Queen Charlotte, the Prince's mother
 Lawrence O'Madden as Lord Southampton
 Frederick Leister as Henry Errington, Maria's uncle
 Scott Forbes as Prince William, the Prince's younger brother
 Barry Morse as Beau Brummell, friend of the Prince
 Eugene Deckers as Philippe
 Ivor Barnard as Reverend Robert Burt, priest at Maria and George's wedding
 Henry Oscar as William Pitt
 Arthur Dulac as Franz Joseph Haydn

Critical reception
In The New York Times, Bosley Crowther wrote, "it is so rigidly played that the whole thing has the appearance of an animated wax-works on the move."

References

External links

1947 films
British biographical drama films
Films set in the 1780s
Films set in the 1790s
Films set in the 1800s
Films set in the 1830s
1940s biographical drama films
Films directed by Montgomery Tully
Films set in Brighton
Films set in London
Films set in Windsor, Berkshire
Films shot at British National Studios
British historical drama films
1940s historical drama films
Cultural depictions of George III
Cultural depictions of George IV
British black-and-white films
1947 drama films
1940s English-language films
1940s British films